George Fisher  (born July 8, 1970), better known by his stage name Corpsegrinder, is an American death metal vocalist who is the lead singer of Cannibal Corpse, Paths of Possession and the supergroup Serpentine Dominion. He recorded two albums with Florida's Monstrosity before leaving and joining Cannibal Corpse in late 1995, replacing vocalist Chris Barnes, who is now the vocalist for Six Feet Under. Fisher released his debut solo album Corpsegrinder on February 25, 2022.

Fisher has also provided guest vocals for New York technical death metal band Suffocation on the songs "Reincremation" and "Mass Obliteration" from their debut album, Effigy of the Forgotten (1991), as well as guest vocals for California deathcore band Suicide Silence on the song "Control" from their fourth album, You Can't Stop Me. Fisher also performed guest vocals on Job for a Cowboy's 2014 album Sun Eater on the song "The Synthetic Sea." In 2021, Fisher performed guest vocals for Boston metalcore band Ice Nine Kills on the song "Take Your Pick", a tribute to My Bloody Valentine from the band’s album The Silver Scream 2: Welcome to Horrorwood.

As a death metal vocalist, Fisher employs the "death growl" extended vocal technique. Fisher has also gained much popularity through the size of his neck. He has explained multiple times that the size of his neck is due to a combination of headbanging and lifting weights when he was younger.

Personal life and interests
Fisher was born in Baltimore, Maryland. He is married and has two daughters. Prior to joining Cannibal Corpse, Fisher worked as a driller's assistant in the Baltimore area. 

Fisher is a huge fan of metal bands such as Death, Slayer, Morbid Angel, Napalm Death, Sodom, Dark Angel, Judas Priest, Black Sabbath, Motörhead, Autopsy, Deicide, Dio, Mercyful Fate, Kreator, Megadeth, Iron Maiden and Metallica. He said, "I am a fan of live records. Unleashed in the East by Judas Priest is probably one of the all-time greatest live records ever put out. I also like the Sodom live disc they put out a while ago, and of course Iron Maiden's classic Live After Death. I also think the live Deicide disc When Satan Lives is great too. Glen Benton's vocals are so powerful." "I listen to a lot of straight edge stuff, you know, from the eighties." He is also an avid Horde player of World of Warcraft. He is a fan of the Washington Wizards and the Denver Broncos.  Fisher is apolitical and has never voted in an election; however, he expressed support to NFL players taking the knee.

Contrary to the subject matter of his music, Fisher's personal life, viewed largely through his Instagram page, has been noted to be "cute" and "wholesome", showing him as a father with his children at Walt Disney World and with large plush toys; he himself has noted an affinity towards winning plush animals from claw machine games, which he then often donates to charity.

Appearances

In 1991, Fisher made his first official studio appearance on Suffocation's Effigy of the Forgotten. His vocals can be heard on the songs "Mass Obliteration" and "Reincremation".

Fisher does occasional guest appearances in the animated series Metalocalypse where he voices the Metal Masked Assassin. He was also the inspiration for the character Nathan Explosion, the lead vocalist for Dethklok. Nathan shares a similar physical appearance to Corpsegrinder, headbangs in a windmill fashion, and also lived in Florida, although Fisher was born in Baltimore and moved to Florida in 1990, because he gave up a death metal band called "Corpsegrinder", in his home city.

Blizzard Entertainment implemented a non-player character named "Gorge the Corpsegrinder" into World of Warcraft: Wrath of the Lich King after he revealed his interest in interviews. Fisher added the phrase "Fuck the Alliance" to the liner notes of the 2006 album Kill, which he noted in a seven-minute interview in 2007. 

On the closing night of BlizzCon in October 2011, the band Level 90 Elite Tauren Chieftain, made up of Blizzard employees, welcomed Fisher to the stage with a 40-second clip taken from the 2007 interview, which included the phrase "die you emo cocksuckers" with "cocksuckers" bleeped. In addition, the video contained a number of homophobic slurs directed at Alliance players. Under pressure from Warcraft players, Blizzard then-President Mike Morhaime apologized for the video. In October 2021, in the wake of Blizzard's abuse lawsuit, this interview resurfaced which led Blizzard to change the name of "Gorge the Corpsegrinder" to “Annihilator Grek’lor."

Discography

Corpsegrinder
 Corpsegrinder (2022)

Cannibal Corpse 
 Vile (1996)
 Gallery of Suicide (1998)
 Bloodthirst (1999)
Gore Obsessed (2002)
The Wretched Spawn (2004)
Kill (2006)
Evisceration Plague (2009)
Torture (2012)
A Skeletal Domain (2014)
Red Before Black  (2017)
Violence Unimagined (2021)

Monstrosity 
Imperial Doom (1992)
Millennium (1996)

Paths of Possession 
The Crypt of Madness (2003)
Promises in Blood (2005)
The End of the Hour (2007)

Voodoo Gods 
Anticipation for Blood Leveled in Darkness (2014)
The Divinity of Blood (2020)

Serpentine Dominion 
 Serpentine Dominion (2016)

Dethklok 
The Doomstar Requiem (2013) – voice of Metal Masked Assassin

Suicide Silence 
 You Can't Stop Me (2014) – guest vocals on track "Control"

Job for a Cowboy 
 Sun Eater (2014) – guest vocals on track "The Synthetic Sea"

Suffocation 
 Effigy of the Forgotten (1991) - guest vocals on tracks "Mass Obliteration" and "Reincremation"

Ektomorf 
 Aggressor (2015) - guest vocals on track "Evil by Nature"

Heaven Shall Burn 
 Wanderer (2016) - guest vocals on track "Prey to God"

Transmetal 
 México Bárbaro (1996) - guest vocals on tracks "México Bárbaro" and "Ceveline"

Igorrr 
 Spirituality and Distortion (2020) - guest vocals on track "Parpaing"

Deeds of Flesh 
 Nucleus (2020) - guest vocals on track "Ethereal Ancestors"

Dee Snider 
 Leave a Scar (2021) - guest vocals on track "Time to Choose"

Ice Nine Kills 
 The Silver Scream 2: Welcome to Horrorwood (2021) - guest vocals on track "Take Your Pick"

Revocation 
 Netherheaven (2022) - guest vocals on track "Re-Crucified"

References

External links

 Interview with Mark Prindle

American heavy metal singers
American male singers
Living people
Death metal musicians
20th-century American singers
21st-century American singers
Cannibal Corpse members
Musicians from Baltimore
1970 births
Serpentine Dominion members